Antonio Giustiniani May refer to: 
Antonio Giustiniani (archbishop of Lipari) (died 1571), Greek Catholic prelate who served as Archbishop of Lipari (1564–1571) and Archbishop of Naxos (1562–1564)
Antonio Giustiniani (archbishop of Naxos) (1663–1730), Greek Catholic prelate who served as Archbishop of Naxos (1701–1730)